Trenwith is a surname. Notable people with the surname include:

George Trenwith (1851–1890), American baseball player
John Trenwith (1951–1998), New Zealand writer, humorist and academic
Mark Trenwith, Australian comedian and actor
Michael Trenwith (born 1945), English cricketer
William Trenwith (1846–1925), Australian trade unionist and politician